The Documentary 2 is the seventh studio album by American rapper the Game. It was released on October 9, 2015, by Blood Money Entertainment and eOne Music. The album serves as a sequel to his debut album. The project is first half of a two-piece project with other half The Documentary 2.5, which was released the following week. The album features guest appearances from Dr. Dre, Ice Cube, Snoop Dogg, Kendrick Lamar, Ab-Soul, Kanye West and Future, among others.

Preceded the album release, the album was supported by lead single: "100" featuring Drake.

Background
In 2015, in an interview with Power 106, the Game announced that the album was about 90% complete and once Dr. Dre gets back from his vacation, him and Dre would be finishing recording the album. The Game also said that his children were his motivation to finish the album, speaking about being confident on his growth as a rapper: "I listened to my first album and everybody thinks it's so amazing, but I think I'm better than that. I listened to it and heard all of the flaws of the young me, and I'm like, 'Man I would have never done this song like that today.'" According to the Game, Dr. Dre was excited about the album that he called The Documentary 2 would be the best rap album in five years. On July 21, 2015, the Game revealed that Diddy said The Documentary 2 is "his best album yet".

Recording and production
On April 12, 2015, the Game released a video, titled "The Making of 'The Documentary 2'", and it shows him in the studio with Meek Mill, working on a song, called "Soundtrack". The video also features cameo appearances from Cool & Dre and Travis Scott. During the 2015's BET Awards on North Carolina's Power 98, the Game said that he has been working with these record producers such as Timbaland, Swizz Beatz, Pharrell Williams, DJ Premier, the Alchemist, Jahlil Beats, Just Blaze, Scott Storch, and Mike Will Made It. While the Game was spending the entire week in the studio with Kanye West, the Game stated that "You get a good solid week out of 'Ye if you have history." On July 6, 2015, the Game shared some footage of himself in the studio with DJ Mustard, Eric Bellinger, YG, Ty Dolla Sign, Bongo 'the Drum Gahd', Busta Rhymes and Keyshia Cole. The video features one of the snippets was a song with Game and Kendrick Lamar that was surfaced later. Joe Moses, Jay 305 and Skeme appeared in the video. Many sites posted possible track lists for the album, however, none of them were official. On July 21, 2015, the Game posted a picture of himself on the toilet, while recording a song for the album on his Instagram. Few days later, the Game posted another picture of himself working on another song with American R&B singer Tyrese, which he said that this collaboration would be on the album. The Game confirmed that Nas, Lil Wayne, E-40, Scarface, Busta Rhymes and YG would be featured on the second disc for the album, called The Documentary 2.5.

Release and promotion
On August 28, 2014, the Game stated that the album would be released on January 18, 2015, and will serve as the 10th anniversary of the first installment. On October 14, 2014, the Game released a compilation album, Blood Moon: Year of the Wolf. On January 30, 2015, a picture of Dr. Dre, the Game, and Ice Cube was posted on Instagram. The inclusion suggested that Dre and Cube were reuniting on the album. On March 12, 2015, the Game announced that the album would be released on June 30, which is his oldest son's birthday. In an interview with Miss Info, Game said spoke about the release of the album. "I feel like I could've released it after The Documentary, but ten years seems perfectly fine. It's my sixth studio album, my sixth solo album, and I think that the 10th anniversary is huge. So, why not put it out ten years later?"

On June 28, 2015, the Game announced that the album would be released on August 7, 2015. Target started promoting the album in stores. The cover shown a new release date of August 28. On July 16, 2015, the Game posted a picture of Tupac with the caption, "Almost time to wrap this album. #TheDocumentary2". On August 30, 2015, he released the cover art for the upcoming album and announced a release date of September 25, 2015. On September 9, 2015, it was revealed that the release date was pushed back to October 9, 2015. On September 18, 2015, the album made available for pre-order, detailing the track listing. On September 22, the Game announced that The Documentary 2 would be a double disc album with a total of 38 tracks, detailing to have disc one releasing on October 9, 2015 and then disc two releasing on October 16, 2015. A documentary about the album, showing how the album was made with studio sessions and video shoots, was released after disc one was released; it is titled The Documentary 2: The Making of the Album.

Critical reception

The Documentary 2 received strong reviews from contemporary music critics. Billboard gave the album 4.5 out of 5 stars. At Metacritic, which assigns a normalized rating out of 100 to reviews from mainstream critics, the album received an average score of 75, which indicates "generally favorable reviews", based on 13 reviews.

Commercial performance
The Documentary 2 debuted at number two on the US Billboard 200, with 95,000 album-equivalent units, which included 85,000 pure album sales.

It serves as the Game's seventh top-ten album in the United States. The album dropped to the number 11 in its second week, earning an additional 28,000 album-equivalent units. As of November 2015, The Documentary 2 had accumulated 140,000 album-equivalent units in the United States, with 116,000 being pure sales.

Track listing

Notes
 "On Me" features additional vocals from Dr. Dre

Sample credits
 "On Me" contains a sample of "On and On" (written by Jaborn Jamal) performed by Erykah Badu.
 "Step Up" contains a sample of "Step In the Arena" performed by Gang Starr, in addition to chorus vocals from "I Get Around" performed by Tupac Shakur; and samples "I Wanna Be Down" performed by Brandy.
 "Don't Trip" contains samples of "Rebirth of Slick (Cool Like Dat)" performed by Digable Planets and Funky Worm, and "More Peas" performed by Fred Wesley and the J.B.'s.
 "Standing on Ferraris" contains samples of "I Put a Spell on You" performed by Screamin Jay Hawkins, and "California My Way" performed by the Main Ingredient.
 "Circles" contains samples of Going in Circles performed by Isaac Hayes, Montara performed by Bobby Hutcherson, and "Song Cry" performed by Jay-Z.
 "Uncle Skit" contains a sample of Cutie Pie performed by One Way.
 "Mula" contains a sample of "Fall in Love" performed by Phantogram.
 "The Documentary 2" contains a sample of "Rickard Escapes" performed by Jerry Goldsmith.
 "100" contains a sample of "Feel the Fire" performed by Peabo Bryson.
 "Just Another Day" contains a sample of "Where I'm From" performed by the Game and Nate Dogg.
 "LA" contains a sample of "Savoir Faire" performed by Chic.

Personnel
Adam Turchin – saxophone
Koofreh Umoren – trumpet

Charts

Weekly charts

Year-end charts

Collector's Edition

The three-disc collector's edition of The Documentary 2 was released on January 22, 2016. The bonus disc features guest appearances from Trey Songz and Meek Mill.  On the chart dated February 13, 2016, Disc 3 debuted on the Billboard 200 chart at number 134.

Track listing

Weekly charts

See also
 List of Billboard number-one R&B/Hip-Hop albums of 2015

References

2015 albums
The Game (rapper) albums
Albums produced by Dr. Dre
Albums produced by Bangladesh (record producer)
Albums produced by Battlecat (producer)
Albums produced by Boi-1da
Albums produced by Cardo
Albums produced by Cool & Dre
Albums produced by DJ Khalil
Albums produced by DJ Mustard
Albums produced by DJ Premier
Albums produced by DJ Quik
Albums produced by Fredwreck
Albums produced by Hit-Boy
Albums produced by Jahlil Beats
Albums produced by Mike Will Made It
Albums produced by Symbolyc One
Albums produced by Tone Mason
Albums produced by Travis Barker
Albums produced by will.i.am
Sequel albums